New Year's Eve Concert 1992: Richard Strauss Gala was a 76-minute televised event presented in Berlin's Philharmonie on 31 December 1992, in which four pieces of music by Richard Strauss were performed by the pianist Martha Argerich and the singers Kathleen Battle, Renée Fleming, Andreas Schmidt and Frederica von Stade with the Berlin Philharmonic Orchestra under the direction of Claudio Abbado. It was jointly produced by Columbia Artists Management and Germany's Zweites Deutsches Fernsehen in association with France's La Sept, Japan's NHK and the United States' PBS, and was released on CD and Laserdisc by Sony Classical Records and on DVD by Kultur Video.

Background
Don Juan is a symphonic poem for large orchestra that Strauss composed in 1888 at the age of twenty-four. One of Strauss's several essays in programme music, it offers a musical analogue of the text of Don Juans Ende, an unfinished play written by Nikolaus Lenau in 1844 shortly before he was overwhelmed by mental illness and confined to an asylum. Lenau in turn drew on a Don Juan tradition dating back to the Spain of the Renaissance era. Strauss conducted the first performance of his work on 11 November 1889 in Weimar, where he held the post of Kapellmeister. The success of the piece gained him international fame as an exponent of modernism.

Strauss composed his Burleske (meaning "farce" or "mockery") for piano and orchestra in 1885-1886, when he was twenty-one. He wrote it for the pianist, conductor and composer Hans von Bülow, but von Bülow thought it a "complicated piece of nonsense" and judged its piano part to be impracticably difficult. Strauss set the piece aside after the discouraging experience of a rehearsal with the Meiningen Orchestra in which he both played the piano and conducted. In 1889, Strauss showed his score to the Scottish-born pianist and composer Eugene d'Albert, who liked it well enough to urge Strauss to try to improve it. D'Albert premiered a revised version of the work, now dedicated to him, on 21 June 1890. Strauss always remained ambivalent about the piece, programming it in concerts with increasing frequency as the years went by but never granting it the honour of an opus number.

The symphonic poem Till Eulenspiegel's Merry Pranks was composed in 1894-1895. Till Eulenspiegel ("Owl-mirror") was the protagonist of an anonymous German chapbook published in 1515. A scatological comedy, the book narrates a series of misadventures encountered by Eulenspiegel as he travels around the Holy Roman Empire playing practical jokes on various fools, hypocrites and figures of authority. Strauss's score depicts Eulenspiegel riding his horse, vandalizing a market, mocking the clergy, flirting with girls, ridiculing scholars and surviving an attempted hanging for blasphemy.

Der Rosenkavalier, Strauss's opera of 1911, tells the story of how Octavian, the young Count Rofrano, transfers his affections from his aristocratic married mistress (the Marschallin) to a bourgeois ingénue (Sophie von Faninal). The drama's final scene comprises a trio ("Marie Theres'...") in which the Marschallin reconciles herself to Octavian's turning away from her and a duet ("Ist ein Traum") in which Octavian and Sophie rejoice in their newly kindled love.

DVD chapter listing
Richard Georg Strauss (1864-1949)
 1 (2:30) Opening credits, incorporating footage of some of Berlin's tourist attractions
 2 (18:23) Don Juan: Tondichtung nach Nikolaus Lenau ("Don Juan, tone-poem after Nikolaus Lenau", Op. 20, Weimar, 1889), with Tōru Yasunaga (solo violin)
 3 (21:14) Burleske für Klavier und Orchester d-moll ("Burlesque for piano and orchestra in D minor", Eisenach, 1890), with Martha Argerich (piano)
 4 (17:31) Till Eulenspiegels lustige Streiche, nach alter Schelmenweise, in Rondeau form ("Till Owlmirror's merry pranks, after an old picaresque legend, in rondo form", Op. 28, Cologne, 1895)
 5 (14:58) Der Rosenkavalier ("The knight of the rose", Op. 59, Dresden, 1911), with a libretto by Hugo von Hofmannsthal (1874-1929) after Les amours du chevalier de Faubles by Jean-Baptiste Louvet de Couvrai (1760-1797) and Monsieur de Pourceaugnac (1669) by Molière (1622-1673). Act 3: trio and finale: "Marie Theres'... Ist ein Traum", with Kathleen Battle (soprano, Sophie), Renée Fleming (soprano, Marschallin), Andreas Schmidt (baritone, Herr von Faninal) and Frederica von Stade (mezzo-soprano, Octavian) 
 6 (2:14) Closing credits

CD track listing
 1 (16:41) Don Juan
 2 (18:45) Burleske für Klavier und Orchester d-moll
 3 (14:30) Till Eulenspiegels lusitige Streiche
 4 (12:41) Der Rosenkavalier: Act 3: trio and finale

Personnel

Artists

 Martha Argerich (b. 1941), piano
 Kathleen Battle (b. 1948), soprano
 Renée Fleming (b. 1959), soprano
 Andreas Schmidt (b. 1960), bass-baritone
 Frederica von Stade (b. 1945), mezzo-soprano
 Tōru Yasunaga (b. 1951), violin
 Berlin Philharmonic Orchestra
 Claudio Abbado (1933-2014), conductor

Broadcast personnel

 Peter Gelb (b. 1953), executive producer
 Barrie Gavin (b. 1935), director
 Joachim Augustin, producer and audio supervisor
 Thomas Frost, audio producer
 David Mottley, audio producer
 Peter Ruppenthal, production manager
 Daniel Anker, associate producer
 Anne Cauvin, associate producer
 Laura Mitgang, associate producer
 Kurt-Oskar Herting, lighting director
 Rotraut Arnold, assistant to the director
 Ursula Veit, vision mixer
 Britta Lindermann, stage manager
 Alfred Schrandt, stage manager
 Joachim Meissner, videotape editor
 Walter Voges, gaffer
 Michael Butz, camera operator
 Andreas Heller, camera operator
 Jorg Hofmann, camera operator
 Rudi Junge, camera operator
 Axel Leist, camera operator
 Gabriele Leist, camera operator
 Hartmut Wilhelm, camera operator
 Gerion Wirthensohn, camera operator
 Wolfgang Becker, additional camera operator
 Gary Bradley, opening title sequence
 Pat Jaffe, opening title sequence
 Arne Ohlendorf, engineer-in-charge
 Walter Wagner, video engineer
 Friedbert Lorenz, video engineer
 Karlfried Pflug, videotape operator
 Sid McLauchlan, sound engineer
 Pauline Heister, sound engineer
 Sebastian Munchmeyer, audio engineer
 Reinhard Reiser, audio engineer
 Timothy Wood, audio engineer

Critical reception

Alan Blyth reviewed the gala on CD in Gramophone in July 1993. "I found this a distressing experience", he wrote. Even the Berlin Philharmonic under Herbert von Karajan could rarely have played the items selected by Claudio Abbado with such remarkable virtuosity, but "that is the trouble: the music is played for that and little else". The album presented Richard Strauss as the "vulgar" composer that his critics alleged him to be. Don Juan and Till Eulenspiegel were portrayed with refulgent strings and belligerent brass that were impressive but alien to Strauss's essential musical personality. Clemens Krauss and Rudolf Kempe had found delight and humour in Strauss's pictures of this pair of rascals; Abbado had not, instead hammering his audience into a feeling of "awesome submission".

Burleske fared better in Abbado's hands than the tone-poems. He eschewed heavy-handedness in favour of at least a modicum of gentleness, and Martha Argerich projected some mischievous wit as well as overcoming the famous difficulties of Strauss's piano writing with her equally famous technical brilliance. There were passages which she approached with a "fearsome attack" that was hyperbolic, but her cadenzas were very enjoyable.

In the trio from Der Rosenkavalier, Abbado was "intent on ferocious power at the expense of radiance". The quality of Renée Fleming's tone promised that her Marschallin  was on the verge of becoming exceptional, but Frederica von Stade had lost the freshness with which she had formerly endowed Octavian, and Kathleen Battle seemed to find Sophie's highest notes in both the trio and the subsequent duet uncomfortably stressful. The three American ladies sang without the "inner warmth and understanding" that some of their German and Austrian predecessors had brought to their roles, but did at least deliver the trio with "accuracy and flair".

Sony's audio engineering emphasized the excesses of Abbado's interpretations. Although the CD was described as a live recording, it provided no evidence of the presence of the Philharmonie's audience until their applause at its very end. Indeed, the listening Berliners were so unobtrusive that one could not but help wondering whether any of the music had been re-recorded after they had gone home - it was difficult to imagine Argerich's pianism failing to elicit an ovation. The notes in Sony's insert booklet, written in humorous vein as though by Strauss himself, were "both facetious and faintly offensive". In sum, the CD was "not a happy issue".

The gala was also reviewed in Classic CD and Hi-Fi News, and was additionally  discussed in The New York Times, Tim Ashley's Richard Strauss (1999), Frithjof Hager's Claudio Abbado: die Anderen in der Stille hören (2000), Ulrich Eckhardt's Claudio Abbado: Dirigent (2003) and Matthew Rye's 1001 classical recordings you must hear before you die (2017).

Home media history
In 1993, Sony Classical Records issued the gala on a 62-minute golden CD (catalogue number SK-52565) accompanied by a 20-page booklet including five production photographs by Vivianne Purdom and notes by Andreas Kluge in English, French, German and Italian. 
The disc was derived from a digital recording made with 20-bit technology. Sony also issued the gala on a CLV (constant linear velocity) Laserdisc (catalogue number SLV-53344) with 4:3 NTSC colour video and CD-quality stereo audio. In 2007, Kultur Video released the gala on a 76-minute DVD (catalogue number D4209). Kultur's DVD offers the same 4:3 NTSC colour video as Sony's Laserdisc but provides its stereo audio only in the compressed Dolby Digital format.

Gallery of personnel

References

1993 classical albums
1992 television films
1992 films
Classical video albums
Live classical albums